Melbourne is a surname and a masculine given name. It is derived from the English toponym Melbourne, named in Old English as 'millstream', from mylen 'mill' and burna 'stream', i.e. the mill by the stream.

Given name
 Melbourne Armstrong Carriker (1879–1965), American ornithologist and entomologist
 Melbourne Parker Boynton (1867–1942), American pastor and temperance proponent
 Melbourne Brindle (1904–1995), Australian-American illustrator and painter
 Melbourne H. Ford (1849–1891), American politician
 Melbourne Gass (1938–2018), Canadian politician
 Melbourne Inman (1878–1951), English snooker player
 Melbourne Johns (1901–1955), Welsh-born munitions factory worker
 Melbourne MacDowell (1856–1941), American stage and screen actor
 Melbourne McTaggart Tait (1842–1917),  Canadian lawyer and judge
 Melbourne Thomas (1896–1966), Welsh rugby union player
 Melbourne Tierney (1923–2014), Welsh rugby league player

Surname
 Charles Melbourne (1838–1891), Australian politician
 Hirini Melbourne (1949–2003), Māori academic, musician, composer and activist
 Jade Melbourne (born 2002), Australian basketball player
 Jimmy Melbourne (c. 1876–1937), Australian rules footballer
 Mark Melbourne (15 April 1984, Clonmel, Co. Tipperary) is an Irish rugby union player
 Max Melbourne (born 1998), English footballer

See also
 Milbourne (disambiguation)
 Milburn (given name)
 Milburn (surname)
 Mel (given name)

Masculine given names
Surnames of English origin
English toponymic surnames